Fathabad-e Shur (also Romanized as Fatḩābād-e Shūr; also known as Fatḩābād) is a village in Yazdanabad Rural District, Yazdanabad District, Zarand County, Kerman Province, Iran. At the 2006 census, its population was 37, in 10 families.

References 

Populated places in Zarand County